The Cabécar language is an indigenous American language of the Chibchan language family spoken by the Cabécar people in the inland Turrialba Region, Cartago Province, Costa Rica. As of 2007, 2,000 speakers were monolingual. It is the only indigenous language in Costa Rica with monolingual adults. The language is also known by its dialect names Chirripó, Estrella, Telire, and Ujarrás.

History 
Cabécar is considered to be one of a few "Chibcha-speaking tribes", categorized by similarities in the languages that they speak. Other Chibcha speaking tribes include the Bribri and the Boruca, also of Costa Rica. It is believed that the languages of the Chibcha speaking tribes shared a common ancestor around 8,000 years ago. However, differences in the languages are thought to have come about from the influence of outside people, including influences from Mesoamerica.

Geographic distribution
Cabécar is an endangered language spoken in Costa Rica. It is spoken by the Cabécar people, an indigenous group located near the Talamancan mountains of Costa Rica.

Dialects and varieties 
There are two different dialects of Cabécar, each of which has more narrow dialects within it. One of these is spoken in the north, while the other is spoken in southern parts of Costa Rica.

Phonology
Cabécar uses a Latin alphabet with umlauts for (ë, ö), and tildes for (ã, ẽ, ĩ, õ, ũ). Cabécar has twelve vowels, five of which are nasalized.

Consonants

Vowels

Grammar
Cabécar has a canonical word order of subject–object–verb.

References

Resources
Quesada, J. D. (2007). The Chibchan Languages. Editorial Tecnologica de CR. 259pp
Gavarrete, M. E. (2015). The challenges of mathematics education for Indigenous teacher training. Intercultural Education, 26(4), 326-337.
Quesada, D. J. (2000). On Language Contact: Another Look at Spanish-speaking (Central) America. Hispanic Research Journal, 1(3), 229-242.
Umaña, A. C. (2012). Chibchan languages. The indigenous languages of South America: A comprehensive guide, 2, 391.
Instituto Clodomiro Picado: Tkäbe tso Costa Rica ska Tkäbe te sa shkawe wätkewaklä (serpientes de Costa Rica y prevención de mordeduras). San José: Instituto Clodomiro Picado; 2009:20.
Lamounier Ferreira, A. (2013). ¿ En cabécar o español?: bilingüismo y diglosia en Alto Chirripó. Centro de Investigación e Identidad y Cultura Latinoamericana. Universidad de Costa Rica. Cuadernos Inter.c.a.mbio sobre Centroamérica y el Caribe Vol.10, no.12 (2013, segundo semestre) 105-119 páginas "Miradas sobre la diversidad indígena"
González Campos, G. (2015). Nuevas consideraciones sobre la morfología verbal del cabécar. LETRAS; Vol 1, No 51 (2012); 33-58. Escuela de Literatura y Ciencias del Lenguaje
Pacheco, M. Á. Q. (2013). Estado de la lengua cabécar en el poblado de San Rafael de Cañas, Buenos Aires (Puntarenas). Estudios de Lingüística Chibcha.
Solórzano, S. F. (2010). Teclado chibcha: un software lingüístico para los sistemas de escritura de las lenguas bribri y cabécar. Revista de Filología y Lingüística de la Universidad de Costa Rica, 36(2).
Potter, E. (1998). The primary education of bilingual indigenous children on the Talamanca Bribri Reservation in Limón Province of Costa Rica/by Elsa Potter. Texas A&M University-Kingsville.
Anderson, W. D. (2006). Medical Education: What Would the Shamans and Witches Think?*. Academic Medicine, 81(10), S138-S143.
Margery Peña, Enrique. 1989. Diccionario Cabécar-Español, Español-Cabécar. Editorial de la Universidad de Costa Rica. 676pp. Reprint 2003.
Cervantes Gamboa, Laura. 1991. Observaciones etnomusicológicas acerca de tres cantos de cuna cabécares. Estudios de Lingüística Chibcha 10. 143-163.
 Elisabeth Verhoeven. 2012. Cabécar – a Chibchan language of Costa Rica. In Jeanette Sakel and Thomas Stolz (eds.), Amerindiana: Neue Perspektiven auf die indigenen Sprachen Amerikas, 151-169. Berlin: Akademie. 
 Pozas Arciniega, Ricardo. Yis ma̱ i shö (yo voy a decir), with Enrique Margery Peña (editor) and Francisco Amighetti (illustrator). Costa Rica: Ministerio de Educación Pública, 1996. . 70pp

External links 
 Recording of "2 children's chants of the Cabécar Indians" from the Indigenous Languages of Costa Rica Collection of Laura Cervantes at AILLA. 
Audio sample
Numeral list 1-20
Christian Bible - Matthew 2
Video of documentary of Cabecar songs
Video with audio and text of Christian hymn "Gloria" in Cabecar
Interview discussing work on Cabecar dictionary (in Spanish)
 Cabécar DoReCo corpus compiled by Juan Diego Quesada, Stavros Skopeteas, Carolina Pasamonik, Carolin Brokmann and Florian Fischer. Audio recordings of narrative texts with transcriptions time-aligned at the phone level, translations, and time-aligned morphological annotations.

Cabécar people
Subject–object–verb languages
Languages of Costa Rica
Cartago Province
Indigenous languages of Central America
Chibchan languages